The Czechoslovakia women's national basketball team was the women's basketball side that represented Czechoslovakia in international competitions. After the country was peacefully dissolved in 1993, the team was succeeded by separate Czech and Slovak teams.

home tournaments
style="border: 3px solid red"|

Competition record

External links 
 (en) Czechoslovakia, archive.fiba.com

|}

Basketball in Czechoslovakia
Former national basketball teams
Women's national basketball teams
W